A Braña is a town in the Valdelugueros municipality, within the province and autonomous community of Asturias, in northern Spain.

The population is 255 (INE 2007).

Villages and hamlets
 Bargaz
 A Braña
 El Caroceiro
 El Chao das Trabas
 Grandamarina
 Mendóis
 Mercadeiros
 Penadecabras
 Romeye
 Villarín

References

Links 
 Brown-skinned, blue-eyed, Y-haplogroup C-bearing European hunter-gatherer from Spain (Olalde et al. 2014)
 Genomic affinities of two 7,000-year-old Iberian hunter-gatherers

Parishes in El Franco